The 37th Varsity Match, which took place on 11 December 1909, came to be known as Poulton's Match. The Varsity Match is a rugby match contested annually between Oxford University RFC and Cambridge University R.U.F.C. The match was played at Queen's Club in London. Oxford won by four goals and five tries to one try, with only fourteen men for most of the game. Ronnie Poulton scored a record five tries.

Background
In the run-up to the 1909 Varsity Match, it was anticipated that the Cambridge forwards would impose themselves and prevent the Oxford attack from getting going. The outcome, therefore, would be a close game, with Cambridge the favourites. Oxford lost three matches in the preceding season, but crucially, in each of them, the captain and flyhalf George Cunningham was absent, and Gotley, the scrumhalf, missed one of them too. Despite heavy rain for the preceding two days, the ground was firm, which was to the advantage of Oxford's running attack, rather than Cambridge's forwards.

The teams 
George Cunningham was Oxford's captain in 1909, taking over from Harold Hodges. He decided to play Ronnie Poulton, who had been overlooked in 1908 for the Varsity Match, despite playing several games for Oxford in his fresher year. The Oxford forwards had two South Africans, Hands and Honey, as well as the first American to win a Blue, D. G. Herring.

The match 

Cambridge kicked off and took the initiative, Scholfield coming close to scoring but prevented by Buchanan's tackle. Soon after, Poulton ran out of a tight corner, evading the Cambridge defence, before passing to Martin, who kicked to touch. In the next play, the ball came down the Oxford back line to Poulton, who ran through the Cambridge defence to score between the posts after just three minutes of play. Cunningham converted. Seven minutes later, Poulton scored his second try. 

Tarr then broke his collarbone in a tackle, and had to leave the field, missing the rest of the game. Buchanan moved up to centre, with Honey coming out of the forwards to take his place at fullback. Yet with seven men in the pack to Cambridge's full contingent of eight, Oxford out-scrummaged their opponents, giving the backs the opportunity to attack. Moments later, Martin scored on the right wing, putting Oxford 11 points ahead after the first quarter.

Oxford now lost a second player, albeit temporarily, after a knee injury to Turner forced him off the field. Cambridge capitalised with a try through Purves, but were left for the most part to defend. Cunningham was then injured, concussed and missing teeth, but returning to the field just before half time, he began a move with Gotley, which led to Poulton going over for his third try. Cambridge, who had expected to dominate the forward play, were matched by Oxford, and the Oxford backs threatened to score every time they had the ball. The score at half time stood 14–3. The second half was all Oxford's: the forwards won the ball; Gotley fed the backs quick, clean ball from the scrums; and Buchanan performed well at centre. Poulton thus scored two more tries, and Martin a further three. The match came to be known as "Poulton's Match", and his record tally of five tries in the Varsity Match still stands today.

Details 
Source:

Reaction 
Poulton's father, Professor Edward Bagnall Poulton in his biography of his son Ronnie, mentions a comment from an unnamed expert who said that "he had never known one side so completely on the top of another. Even the points scored give an inadequate impression of the difference between the teams..." The referee, F. C. Potter-Irwin, was quoted in the press as saying it had been the fastest and most spectacular Varsity Match he had ever witnessed.

See also

Bibliography

References

Cambridge University R.U.F.C.
Oxford University RFC
1909–10 in English rugby union
Rugby union matches